The Producers Guild of America Award for Outstanding Producer of Documentary Theatrical Motion Pictures is an award annually given by Producers Guild of America since 2007.

Winners and nominees

2000s

2010s

2020s

Multiple nominations and wins

References

Documentary
American documentary film awards
Awards established in 2007